Plaza Moraga is a public square in Manila, Philippines. Serving as the gateway to Manila's Chinatown of Binondo, the plaza is located at the foot of Jones Bridge at the west end of Escolta Street. It was named after a Franciscan friar, Fr. Fernando de Moraga and it is by the opinion of many, that were it not for him, the history of the Philippines would turn out differently from what it is now.

History 

Plaza Moraga came to develop during the American colonization period. It was the place where superb restaurants, commercial establishments and foreign embassies could be found. One of the familiar places-to-visit here was the Clarke's Cafe which opened in 1899. They were known for selling ice cream.

Fernando de Moraga 
The Venerable Fernando de Moraga was born in one of the towns in the province of Salamanca, Spain. In 1597, he visited the Philippines and stayed for a short period near Plaza Dilao in Paco and some of the towns in the provinces of Bulacan and Laguna. In 1607, he was appointed as the parish priest of Santa Ana.

In Intramuros, he also became the local Superior of the San Francisco Convent some years after his duty in Santa Ana. He was elected as the Chapter president before being delegated to the General Chapter in Spain in 1616. He reached Spain in 1619 while traveling barefooted through the Middle East while begging, evangelizing and baptizing along the way.

Fr. Moraga has convinced the King, through his persuasion and knowledge on the colony to revoke the decree and keep the Philippines during that time when King Philip III of Spain had issued a decree that included surrendering the Philippines.

In recent years 
Plaza Moraga has now become a plaza occupied mostly by cars and a big parking space is designated on one of the corners. There are still commercial buildings surrounding the plaza including The Original Savory Restaurant, a Chinese restaurant known for their chicken. It succeeded the famed Savory Restaurant that was razed by fire in 2015. However, the famous ice cream parlor is already closed.

In June 2015, the world's largest Chinatown arch was built on the south side of Plaza Moraga at the entrance to Binondo from Jones Bridge in celebration of the city's 444th founding anniversary as well as the 40th anniversary of Philippines-China diplomatic ties.

References 

Moraga, Plaza
Buildings and structures in Binondo